This article is about the list of Sporting Clube da Praia players.  Sporting Clube da Praia is a Cape Verdean football team based in Praia, Cape Verde and plays at Estádio da Várzea.  The team was formed on 2 December 1929.

One of the greatest players were Caló and was one of the players that had the most appearance in club history.  One of the greatest scorers were Zé di Tchecha.

List of players

Youth players

Notes

References

External links
List of Sporting Clube da Praia players at the official Sporting Praia website 

 
Sporting Praia
Association football player non-biographical articles